Lisette Dufour (born April 2nd, 1949) is a Québécoise voice actress who is better known as the French voice of Lisa Simpson on The Simpsons.

She also did a number of French dubbings, including most notably Pocahontas in the Disney movie.

References

External links 
 

1949 births
Canadian voice actresses
French Quebecers
Living people